The Vuelta a Cantabria is a multi-day road cycling race held annually in the region of Cantabria, Spain. Created in 1925, the race was also held in 1926, 1940 and 1942, and annually from 1963 to 1983. In 2003, the race reappeared after a 20-year disappearance and is now reserved to amateur cyclists.

Winners

References

1925 establishments in Spain
Cycle races in Spain
Recurring sporting events established in 1925
Cycle racing in Cantabria